USA Boxing is the national governing body for Olympic-style boxing.  It is overseen by the United States Olympic Committee and the International Boxing Association (AIBA), which sets its rules.

Headquartered in Colorado Springs, CO, USA Boxing is a non-profit organization responsible for the administration, development and promotion of Olympic-style boxing in the United States.

USA Boxing, formerly known as the United States Amateur Boxing Federation, has governed men's amateur boxing in the United States since 1969. USA Boxing officially recognized women's boxing in 1993, becoming the first organization to do so in the world.

USA Boxing comprises 56 Local Boxing Committees, which are grouped into 13 geographical regions. These LBCs, along with the coaches, athletes, and officials, form the backbone of USA Boxing and Olympic-style boxing in the United States. Boxing facilities, coaches, officials and athletes may be affiliated with USA Boxing, with athletes receiving an official "passbook" to be presented and marked at all sanctioned events. Athletes are classified according to age, gender and weight, with boxers younger than seventeen known as "juniors" and those thirty-five or older known as "masters".

The national amateur boxing championships now sponsored by USA Boxing and titled the United States Championships were formerly the AAU (Amateur Athletic Union) Boxing championships.  The Championships crown a United States Amateur Champion in each of the sanctioned weight classes.

USA Boxing organizes the USA Knockouts team in the World Series of Boxing.

Weight Classes - Elite Men
Light flyweight (106 pounds, 48 kg)
Flyweight (112 pounds, 51 kg)
Bantamweight (119 pounds, 54 kg)
Featherweight (125 pounds, 57 kg)
Lightweight (132 pounds, 60 kg)
Light welterweight (141 pounds, 64 kg)
Welterweight (152 pounds, 69 kg)
Middleweight (165 pounds, 75 kg)
Light heavyweight (178 pounds, 81 kg)
Heavyweight (201 pounds, 91 kg)
Super heavyweight (201+ pounds, 91+ kg)
Weight Classes - Elite Women 
 Light flyweight (106 pounds, 48 kg)
Flyweight (112 pounds, 51 kg) - Olympic Weight Class
Bantamweight (119 pounds, 54 kg)
Featherweight (125 pounds, 57 kg)
Lightweight (132 pounds, 60 kg) - Olympic Weight Class
Light welterweight (141 pounds, 64 kg)
Welterweight (152 pounds, 69 kg)
Middleweight (165 pounds, 75 kg) - Olympic Weight Class
Light heavyweight (178 pounds, 81 kg)
Heavyweight (178+ pounds, 81+ kg)

National Amateur Champions
Below are the lists of the national amateur champions, by division:
National Amateur Super Heavyweight Champions
National Amateur Heavyweight Champions
National Amateur Light Heavyweight Champions
National Amateur Middleweight Champions
National Amateur Light Middleweight Champions
National Amateur Welterweight Champions
National Amateur Light Welterweight Champions
National Amateur Lightweight Champions
National Amateur Featherweight Champions
National Amateur Bantamweight Champions
National Amateur Flyweight Champions
National Amateur Light Flyweight Champions

Dispute with the IBA
In February 2023, USA Boxing announced its decision to boycott the 2023 World Championships (organized by the International Boxing Association) where Russian and Belarusian athletes will compete with no restrictions, also accusing the IBA of attempting to sabotage IOC-approved qualification pathway for the 2024 Summer Olympics. Poland, Switzerland, the Netherlands, Great Britain, Ireland, Czechia, Sweden and Canada later joined the U.S.

See also
 Association of Boxing Commissions

References

External links
 
 Amateur Boxing Records Database

United States
Boxing
Boxing in the United States
Organizations based in Colorado Springs, Colorado
Sports in Colorado Springs, Colorado